A horsecar, horse-drawn tram, horse-drawn streetcar (U.S.), or horse-drawn railway (historical), is an animal-powered (usually horse) tram or streetcar.

Summary 

The horse-drawn tram (horsecar) was an early form of public rail transport, which developed out of industrial haulage routes that had long been in existence, and from the omnibus routes that first ran on public streets in the 1820s{, using the newly improved iron or steel rail or 'tramway'. They were local versions of the stagecoach lines and picked up and dropped off passengers on a regular route, without the need to be pre-hired. Horsecars on tramlines were an improvement over the omnibus, because the low rolling resistance of metal wheels on iron or steel rails (usually grooved from 1852 on) allowed the animals to haul a greater load for a given effort than the omnibus, and gave a smoother ride. The horse-drawn streetcar combined the low cost, flexibility, and safety of animal power with the efficiency, smoothness, and all-weather capability of a rail track. Animal power at the time was seen as safer than steam power in that early locomotives frequently suffered from boiler explosions. Rails were seen as all-weather because streets of the time might be poorly paved, or not paved at all, allowing wagon wheels to sink in mud during rain or snow.

History

Canada 
In 1861, Toronto Street Railway horsecars replaced horse-drawn omnibuses as a public transit mode in Toronto. Electric streetcars later replaced the horsecars between 1892 and 1894. The streets were unpaved, and a step rail was employed. The horsecars had flanged wheels and ran on the upper level of the step. Ordinary wagons and carriages ran on the broad lower step inside. This necessitated a wider gauge. This broad Toronto gauge is still used today by the Toronto streetcar system and three lines of the Toronto subway. The Metropolitan Street Railway operated a horsecar line in then-suburban North Toronto from 1885 until the line was electrified in 1890; this horsecar line also used Toronto gauge.

India 

The first horse-drawn trams in India ran a  distance between Sealdah and Armenian Ghat Street on 24 February 1873. The service was discontinued on 20 November of that year. The Calcutta Tramway Company was formed and registered in London on 22 December 1880. Metre-gauge horse-drawn tram tracks were laid from Sealdah to Armenian Ghat via Bowbazar Street, Dalhousie Square and Strand Road. The route was inaugurated by Viceroy Ripon on 1 November 1880. In 1882, steam locomotives were deployed experimentally to haul tram cars. By the end of the 19th century the company owned 166 tram cars, 1000 horses, seven steam locomotives and 19 miles of tram tracks. In 1902, the first electric tramcar in India ran from Esplanade to Kidderpore on 27 March and on 14 June from Esplanade to Kalighat.

The Bombay Tramway Company was set up in 1873. After a contract was signed between the Bombay Tramway Company, the municipality and the Stearns and Kitteredge company, the Bombay Presidency enacted the Bombay Tramways Act, 1874 licensing the company to run a horsecar tram service in the city. On 9 May 1874 the first horse-drawn carriage made its début in the city, plying the Colaba–Pydhone via Crawford Market, and Bori Bunder to Pydhonie via Kalbadevi routes. The initial fare was three annas (15 paise pre-decimalisation), and no tickets were issued. As the service became increasingly popular, the fare was reduced to two annas (10 pre-decimalisation paise). Later that year, tickets were issued to curb increasing ticket-less travel. Stearns and Kitteredge reportedly had a stable of 1,360 horses over the lifetime of  the service.

United Kingdom
The first tram services in the world were started by the Swansea and Mumbles Railway in Wales, using specially designed carriages on an existing tramline built for horse-drawn freight dandies. Fare-paying passengers were carried on a line between Oystermouth, Mumbles and Swansea Docks from 1807.  The Gloucester and Cheltenham Tramroad (1809) carried passengers although its main purpose was freight.

In spite of its early start, it took many years for horse-drawn streetcars to become widely acceptable across Britain; the American George Francis Train first introduced them to Birkenhead Corporation Tramways' predecessor in Birkenhead in 1860 but was jailed for "breaking and injuring" the highway when he next tried to lay the first tram tracks on the roads of London. An 1870 Act of Parliament overcame these legal obstacles by defining responsibilities and for the next three decades many local tramway companies were founded, using horse-drawn carriages, until replaced by cable, steam or electric traction. Many companies adopted a design of a partly enclosed double-decker carriage hauled by two horses. The last horse-drawn tram was retired from London in 1915. Horses continued to be used for light shunting well into the 20th century. The last horse used for shunting on British Railways was retired on 21 February 1967 in Newmarket, Suffolk.

United States
In the United States the very first streetcar appeared in New Orleans in 1832, operated by the Pontchartrain Railroad Company, followed by those in 1832 on the New York and Harlem Railroad in New York City. The latter cars were designed by John Stephenson of New Rochelle, New York, and constructed at his company in New York City. The earliest streetcars used horses and sometimes mules, usually two as a team, to haul the cars. Rarely, other animals were tried, including humans in emergency circumstances. By 1890 New Yorkers took 297 horsecar rides per capita per year. The average street car horse had a life expectancy of about two years.

Elsewhere
The first horse-drawn rail cars on the Continental Europe were operated from 1828 by the České Budějovice - Linz railway. Europe saw a proliferation of horsecar use for new tram services from the mid-1860s, with many towns building new networks.

Tropical plantations (for products such as henequen and bananas) made extensive use of animal-powered trams for both passengers and freight, often employing the Decauville narrow-gauge portable track system. Surviving examples may be found in both the Yucatan and Brazil.

Decline
Problems with horsecars included the fact that any given animal could only work so many hours on a given day, had to be housed, groomed, fed and cared for day in and day out, and produced prodigious amounts of manure, which the streetcar company was charged with storing and then disposing. Since a typical horse pulled a streetcar for about a dozen miles a day and worked for four or five hours, many systems needed ten or more horses in stable for each horsecar.

Horsecars were largely replaced by electric-powered streetcars following the invention by Frank J. Sprague of an overhead trolley system on streetcars for collecting electricity from overhead wires. His spring-loaded trolley pole used a wheel to travel along the wire. In late 1887 and early 1888, using his trolley system, Sprague installed the first successful large electric street railway system in Richmond, Virginia. 
Long a transportation obstacle, the hills of Richmond included grades of over 10%, and were an excellent proving ground for acceptance of the new technology in other cities. Within a year, the economy of electric power had replaced more costly horsecars in many cities. By 1889, 110 electric railways incorporating Sprague's equipment had been begun or planned on several continents.

Many large metropolitan lines lasted well into the early twentieth century. New York City had a regular horsecar service on the Bleecker Street Line until its closure in 1917. Pittsburgh, Pennsylvania, had its Sarah Street line drawn by horses until 1923. The last regular mule-drawn cars in the US ran in Sulphur Rock, Arkansas, until 1926 and were commemorated by a U.S. postage stamp issued in 1983.
Toronto's horse-drawn streetcar operations ended in 1891. In other countries animal-powered tram services often continued well into the 20th century; the last mule tram service in Mexico City ended in 1932, and a mule tram in Celaya, Mexico, survived until 1954.

Operational horsecars
A few original horsecar lines have survived or have been revived as tourist attractions, and in recent years several replica horsecar lines have been built. Below is a list of locations around the world with operational horsecars that are open to the public.

See also

Cable car (railway)
Carville (San Francisco)
Dandy waggon
Hay Railway
List of horse-drawn railways
Omaha Horse Railway
Rail transport in Walt Disney Parks and Resorts
Slate waggon
Trolley (horse-drawn)
Wagonway (horse-drawn railways)

References

External links
The oldest surviving horse drawn tramway operating in Douglas on the Isle of Man

Colombia's horsecar history and restoration process 
History of Columbus, Ohio horsecar lines from 1863 to 1892
Pennsylvania Trolley Museum
Reader's Companion to American History, Public Transportation: the Horsecar
Trolleys: The Cars That Built Our Cities by Transit Gloria Mundi 

 
Horse transportation